Uchqoʻrgʻon is a city and seat of Uchqoʻrgʻon District in Namangan Region in eastern Uzbekistan. In 1989 it had a population of 23,772, and 40,000 in 2016.

In 1969 Uchqoʻrgʻon was granted city status. The city has cotton-cleaning and oil-extracting factories.

Etimology 
Uchqoʻrgʻon is translated from Uzbek as "three kurgan" or "three fortifications".

References

Populated places in Namangan Region
Cities in Uzbekistan